Michael Douglas Thornton (born 1 May 1952) is a British politician and former Liberal Democrat Member of Parliament for Eastleigh in Hampshire. He was elected at the Eastleigh by-election held on 28 February 2013, a seat which he lost at the 2015 general election.

Early life
The son of Sir Peter Eustace Thornton, Thornton grew up in Farnham in Surrey and was educated at Charterhouse School, before reading law at Manchester Polytechnic. He has had a range of jobs, including spells in the United States (his mother is from Tennessee). Thornton spent a significant period of time working in financial services.

He has lived in Bishopstoke, a part of Eastleigh borough, since 1994. He has variously been a Bishopstoke parish councillor, an Eastleigh borough councillor and a Hampshire county councillor, for wards within or containing Bishopstoke.

Parliamentary career 
Following the resignation of the previous Liberal Democrat MP Chris Huhne, Thornton was chosen as their candidate at the 2013 Eastleigh by-election to replace him. This took place on 28 February 2013 and Thornton was declared the winner in the early hours of 1 March.

In Parliament, Thornton joined the European Scrutiny Committee, the Work and Pensions Committee and the Bill committee for HS2, which he argued "would benefit the country as a whole, not just the cities that link to it".

His defeat at the 2015 general election was unexpected. Although he only defended a small numerical majority of 1,771, the Eastleigh constituency was otherwise a stronghold, with the Liberal Democrats holding almost every seat on the council for many years. During the 2013 by-election it had been reported that whilst the local Liberal Democrats commanded a vast database of supporters on the ground that enabled them to get their vote out, the local Tory organisation in the constituency was practically non-existent. Indeed, at the 2013 by-election, the Conservatives had been beaten into third place by UKIP.

References

External links 
Constituency website

1952 births
Living people
People educated at Charterhouse School
Alumni of Manchester Metropolitan University
People from Farnham
Liberal Democrats (UK) MPs for English constituencies
UK MPs 2010–2015
English people of American descent
Liberal Democrats (UK) councillors
People from Bishopstoke